Gold Coast Cougars may refer to:
 Gold Coast Cougars, a defunct Australian baseball team
 Gold Coast Rollers (NBL), a defunct Australian basketball team formerly known as Gold Coast Cougars
 Gold Coast Rollers (QBL), an Australian basketball club formerly known as Gold Coast Cougars